Doreen Eagles is a Canadian provincial politician. She was the Saskatchewan Party member of the Legislative Assembly of Saskatchewan for the constituency of Estevan from 1999 until 2016.

Doreen was born in Midale, Saskatchewan and grew up in Macoun-Estevan area on her families farm. Doreen received her education in Macoun. Doreen and her husband Vic Eagles have two children: Terry and Trisha, both who have children of their own.

References

Women MLAs in Saskatchewan
Saskatchewan Party MLAs
Living people
21st-century Canadian politicians
21st-century Canadian women politicians
Year of birth missing (living people)